The following elections occurred in the year 1983.

Africa
 1983 Cameroonian parliamentary election
 1983 Equatorial Guinean legislative election
 1983 Kenyan general election
 1983 Malagasy parliamentary election
 1983 Malawian general election
 1983 Mauritian general election
 1983 Nigerian parliamentary election
 1983 Nigerian presidential election
 1983 Rwandan parliamentary election
 1983 Rwandan presidential election
 1983 Senegalese general election
 1983 Seychellois parliamentary election
 1983 Swazi parliamentary election
 1983 Zambian general election

Asia
 1983 Japanese House of Councillors election
 1983 Japanese general election
 1983 Republic of China legislative election
 1983 Sarawak state election
 1983 Turkish general election

Europe
 1983 Åland legislative election
 1983 Finnish parliamentary election
 1983 Icelandic parliamentary election
 1983 Irish presidential election
 1983 Italian general election
 1983 Norwegian local elections
 1983 Portuguese legislative election
 1983 Austrian legislative election
 1983 French municipal elections

Germany
 1983 Rhineland-Palatinate state election
 1983 West German federal election

Spain
 Elections to the Aragonese Corts, 1983
 Elections to the Corts Valencianes, 1983

United Kingdom
 1983 Bermondsey by-election
 1983 Darlington by-election
 1983 United Kingdom general election
 List of MPs elected in the 1983 United Kingdom general election
 1983 Labour Party leadership election (UK)
 1983 Penrith and The Border by-election

United Kingdom local
 1983 United Kingdom local elections

English local
 1983 Bristol City Council election
 1983 Manchester Council election
 1983 Trafford Council election
 1993 Wiltshire Council election
 1983 Wolverhampton Council election

North America

Canada
 1983 British Columbia general election
 1983 Edmonton municipal election
 1983 Manitoba municipal elections
 1983 Northwest Territories general election
 1983 Progressive Conservative leadership election
 1983 Winnipeg municipal election

Caribbean
 1983 Jamaican general election

United States
 1983 United States gubernatorial elections
 1983 Louisiana gubernatorial election
 1983 United States gubernatorial elections
 1983 Louisiana gubernatorial election

Oceania
 March 1983 Cook Islands general election
 November 1983 Cook Islands general election
 1983 Vanuatuan general election

Australia
 1983 Australian federal election
 1983 Bragg state by-election
 1983 Bruce by-election
 1983 Moreton by-election
 1983 Northern Territory general election
 1983 Queensland state election
 1983 Wannon by-election
 1983 Western Australian state election

South America
 1983 Argentine general election
 1983 Venezuelan presidential election

See also

 
1983
Elections